The  or  (from Latin: "The Secret of Secrets"), also known as the , is a pseudo-Aristotelian treatise which purports to be a letter from Aristotle to his student Alexander the Great on an encyclopedic range of topics, including statecraft, ethics, physiognomy, astrology, alchemy, magic, and medicine. The earliest extant editions claim to be based on a 9th-century Arabic translation of a Syriac translation of the lost Greek original. Modern scholarship finds it likely to have been a 10th-century work composed in Arabic. Translated into Latin in the mid-12th century, it was influential among European intellectuals during the High Middle Ages.

Origin
The origin of the treatise remains uncertain. The Arabic edition claims to be a translation from Greek by 9th-century scholar  Abu Yahya ibn al-Batriq (died 806 CE), and one of the main translators of Greek-language philosophical works for Al-Ma'mun, working from a Syriac edition which was itself translated from a Greek original. It contains supposed letters from Aristotle to his pupil Alexander the Great. No such texts have been discovered and it appears the work was actually composed in Arabic. The letters may thus derive from the Islamic and Persian legends surrounding Alexander. The Arabic treatise is preserved in two versions: a longer 10-book version and a shorter version of 7 or 8 books, the latter is preserved in about 50 copies.

Modern scholarship considers that the text must date to after the Encyclopedia of the Brethren of Purity and before the work of Ibn Juljul in the late 10th century. The section on physiognomy may have been circulating as early as AD 940. The Arabic version was translated into Persian (at least twice), Ottoman Turkish (twice), Hebrew, Spanish, and twice into Latin. (The Hebrew edition was also the basis for a translation into Russian.) The first Latin translation of a part of the work was made for the Portuguese queen  by the converso John of Seville; it is now preserved in about 150 copies. The second translation, this time of the whole work, was done at Antioch  by the canon Philip of Tripoli for Bishop Guy of Tripoli; it is preserved in more than 350 copies. Some 13th-century editions include additional sections.

Contents
The Secretum Secretorum claims to be a treatise written by Aristotle to Alexander during his conquest of Achaemenid Persia. Its topics range from ethical questions that face a ruler to astrology to the medical and magical properties of plants, gems, and numbers to an account of a unified science which is accessible only to a scholar with the proper moral and intellectual background. Copland's English translation is divided into sections on the work's introduction, the Manner of Kings, Health, the Four Seasons of the Year, Natural Heat, Food, Justice, Physiognomy, and Comportment.

The enlarged 13th-century edition includes alchemical references and an early version of the Emerald Tablet.

Legacy
It was one of the most widely read texts of the High Middle Ages or even the most-read. Amid the 12th-century Renaissance's Recovery of Aristotle, medieval readers took the ascription to Aristotle at face value and treated this work among Aristotle's genuine works. It is particularly connected with the 13th-century English scholar Roger Bacon, who cited it more often than his contemporaries and even produced an edited manuscript with his own introduction and notes, an unusual honor. This led mid-20th century scholars like Steele to claim that Bacon's contact with the Secretum Secretorum was the key event pushing him towards experimental science; more recent scholarship is less sweeping in its claims but still accords it an important place in research of his later works.

The Latin Secretum Secretorum was eventually translated into Czech, Russian, Croatian, Dutch, German, Icelandic, English, Aragonese, Catalan, Spanish, Portuguese, French, Italian, and Welsh. The 1528 English translation by Robert Copland was based on Philip of Tripoli's Latin edition.

Scholarly attention to the Secretum Secretorum waned around 1550 but lay interest has continued to this day among students of the occult. Scholars today see it as a window onto medieval intellectual life: it was used in a variety of scholarly contexts and had some part to play in the scholarly controversies of the day.

The Book of Secrets
There is another book called The Book of Secrets by Muhammad ibn Zakariya al-Razi, which appeared in Europe around the same time and has been often confused with the Secretum Secretorum. It deals more specifically with alchemy, providing practical recipes, classification of minerals, and descriptions of laboratory equipment and procedures.

The Book on Physiognomy
There is a third book called The Book on Physiognomy which was also attributed to Aristotle and claimed to have been translated into Arabic by Hunayn ibn Ishaq in the 9th century.

Notes

References
This article incorporates text derived from NLM Microfilm Reel: FILM 48-123 no. 4; online version.

Further reading
 Regula Forster, Das Geheimnis der Geheimnisse: die arabischen und deutschen Fassungen des pseudo-aristotelischen Sirr al-asrar / Secretum Secretorum, Wiesbaden, Reichert, 2006, .
 Mahmoud Manzalaoui, "The pseudo-Aristotelian Kitab Sirr al-asrar: facts and problems", Oriens, vol. 23-24 (1974), pp. 146–257.
 Steven J. Williams, The Secret of Secrets: the scholarly career of a pseudo-Aristotelian text in the Latin Middle Ages,  Ann Arbor, University of Michigan Press, 2003, .
 Steven J. Williams, "The early circulation of the pseudo-Aristotelian 'Secret of Secrets' in the west", in Micrologus, n°2 (1994), pp. 127–144.

External links
Secretum secretorum of pseudo-Aristotle: e-text (in English, dated 1528)
Three Late Medieval English Translations of the Secreta Secretorum, from late medieval manuscripts, historically valuable for their preservation of late medieval English.
 Lewis E 16 Secreta secretorum (Secrets of Secrets) at OPenn

Literature of the Umayyad Caliphate
10th-century Arabic books
Scientific works of the medieval Islamic world
Translations into Latin
12th-century Latin books
Pseudoaristotelian works
Political books
Occult books
Alexander the Great in legend
Ancient Greek pseudepigrapha